Peter Neave Buchanan (11 January 1889 – 30 January 1957) was a rugby union player who represented Australia.

Buchanan, a centre, was born in Wellington and claimed 1 international rugby cap for Australia.

References

Australian rugby union players
Australia international rugby union players
1889 births
1957 deaths
Rugby union centres
Rugby union players from Wellington City